F. P. Journe, legally Montres Journe SA is a Swiss-French high-end watch Manufacture d'horlogerie founded in 1999 by François-Paul Journe. The only three-time winner of the Aiguille d'Or grand prize from the Fondation du Grand Prix d'Horlogerie de Genève, Journe focuses on complex precision chronometers with a production of around 800 watches per year. 20% of the company was acquired by Chanel in 2018 for an undisclosed amount.

F.P.Journe is the only watchmaker still based in central Geneva, with company headquarters, manufacturing facilities, and an exhibition space with library housed in a converted gaslamp factory in the Coulouvreniere Rois neighborhood. F.P. Journe also owns its own casemaker, Les Boîtiers de Genève, and its own dialmaker, Les Cadraniers de Genève, housed in the same facility in Meyrin, a municipality in the Canton of Geneva.

The company's motto, Invenit et Fecit (Latin for "[He] invented it and made it"), denotes that the company designs and builds the entirety of the watch movements.

History 

François-Paul Journe was born in Marseille in 1957. An unruly child, he was sent to a local technical college at the age of 14. He went on to graduate from the Paris watchmaking school in 1976.

The motto of the brand, Invenit et Fecit (Latin for "[He] invented it and made it") denotes that the company designs and builds the entirety of the movements. Journe's movement designs are original and he has invented completely new systems, such as the resonance chronometer.

Journe was interviewed in 2008 by Lusso magazine. The writer, Oliver Walston, said "He welcomed me with a big smile, but perhaps this is because I already own two of his watches".

Awards 

F.P. Journe has won the Aiguille d'Or grand prize at the Grand Prix d'Horlogerie on three occasions:  In 2004 for the Tourbillon Souverain à seconde morte, the current-generation Tourbillon Souverain with dead beat seconds; in 2006 for the Sonnerie Souverain, both a Grand Sonnerie and a Petit Sonnerie for which F.P. Journe received 10 patents; and in 2008 for the Centigraphe Souverain, a chronograph with timekeeping isolated from chronograph mechanism, allowing the chronograph to measure hundredths of a second despite a 3 Hz movement. No other manufacture has won the Aiguille d'Or more than twice.

F.P. Journe has also won four category prizes at the Grand Prix d'Horlogerie: the 2002 Special Jury Prize for the Octa Calendrier; the 2003 Men's Watch Prize for the Octa Lune; the 2005 Men's Watch Prize for the Chronomètre Souverain; and the 2010 Complicated Watch Prize for the Chronomètre à Résonance.

Philanthropy

Only Watch 

F.P. Journe participated in the Only Watch auction for the first time in 2015, submitting the Tourbillon Souverain Bleu - a tourbillon watch based on the Chronomètre Bleu, including a chrome blue dial and a tantalum case, the latter which is very rare for a tourbillon. As with the standard Tourbillon Souverain, it features an in-house rose gold movement and remontoire d'egalite, as well as dead beat seconds.

For the 2017 edition of Only Watch, F.P. Journe donated a monopusher split-seconds chronograph in 44mm with a blue dial and featuring a completely new movement that would not be used in any other F.P Journe watches. F.P. Journe later released a modified version of the movement in the "lineSport"-brand Chronographe Monopoussoir Rattrapante series.

Action Innocence 

F.P. Journe has donated watches to auctions benefiting Swiss charity . In 2015, a special purple dial Tourbillon Souverain raised  while a special purple dial Elegante raised .

Distribution 
F.P. Journe watches are only available through company-owned boutiques and official retail partnerships (branded as "ESPACE F.P. Journe"). The current ten company-owned boutiques, listed in order of opening date, are located in:

 Tokyo, opened May 2003
 Hong Kong, opened October 2006
 Geneva, opened April 2007
 New York City, opened November 2009
 Paris, opened December 2009
 Los Angeles, opened July 2013
 Beirut, opened September 2014
 Kyiv, opened February 2017
 Miami, opened March 2019
 Dubai, opened October 2019

Patrimoine Service 

In 2016, F.P. Journe launched Patrimoine Service, an official program that acquires out-of-production watches for interested collectors. F.P. Journe purchases, authenticates, and services the watches at their Geneva headquarters, then resells the watches via their official boutiques. A new guarantee card, box, and three-year warranty accompany all watches sold via the Patrimoine Service. F.P. Journe is the first Swiss manufacture to offer such a service.

References

Bibliography

External links 
 Official site
 Forum on timezone.com
 F. P. Journe - Past, Present and Future

Watch manufacturing companies of Switzerland
Manufacturing companies established in 1999
1999 establishments in Switzerland
Manufacturing companies based in Geneva